Ronald Rüeger (born February 26, 1973 in Bülach, Switzerland) is a Swiss former professional ice hockey goaltender who played in the Swiss National League A (NLA). He also represented the Switzerland men's national ice hockey team on several occasions in the World Championships and Olympics in which he currently serves as a Goaltending Coach.

References

External links

1973 births
Living people
AIK IF players
EHC Bülach players
EV Zug players
HC Ambrì-Piotta players
HC Davos players
HC Lugano players
EHC Kloten players
Lausanne HC players
Olympic ice hockey players of Switzerland
Ice hockey players at the 2010 Winter Olympics
People from Bülach
SC Herisau players
Swiss ice hockey goaltenders
Sportspeople from the canton of Zürich